Jeanne Arth (born July 21, 1935) is an American tennis player who won women's doubles titles at the Wimbledon Championships and the U.S. National Championships.

Arth graduated from Central High School in Saint Paul, Minnesota in 1952 and attended the College of St. Catherine. Arth and her partner Darlene Hard won women's doubles titles at the U.S. National Championships in 1958 and 1959 and at the Wimbledon Championships in 1959.

Arth received the Lions Club outstanding athlete award in 1958 and was inducted into the Saint Paul Central Athletic Hall of Fame in 1995.

Grand Slam finals

Women's doubles (3 titles)

References

External links
 

1935 births
Living people
American female tennis players
Sportspeople from Saint Paul, Minnesota
Tennis people from Minnesota
United States National champions (tennis)
Wimbledon champions (pre-Open Era)
St. Catherine University alumni
Grand Slam (tennis) champions in women's doubles
21st-century American women